The 2014 Oklahoma City mayoral election took place on March 4, 2014, to elect the Mayor of Oklahoma City. The election was won by Mick Cornett who won re-election to a fourth term.

Candidates
 Mick Cornett, incumbent mayor of Oklahoma City.
 Phil Hughes, electrical engineer
 Joe Sarge Nelson, retired businessman
 Ed Shadid, Oklahoma City councilman.

Results

References

Oklahoma City
Oklahoma City
2014